Alan Bray (19 June 1929 – 8 October 2016) was a British sports shooter. He competed in the 25 metre pistol event at the 1964 Summer Olympics.

References

1929 births
2016 deaths
British male sport shooters
Olympic shooters of Great Britain
Shooters at the 1964 Summer Olympics
People from Hinckley
Sportspeople from Leicestershire